The Kingdom of Sweden and the North Atlantic Treaty Organization (NATO) have a close relationship and regularly carry out joint exercises, cooperate in peacekeeping operations and share information. Sweden is one of six members of the European Union that are not members of NATO. Sweden joined the Partnership for Peace on 9 May 1994.

Historically, a minority of the Swedish population has been in favour of NATO membership, but the question of membership rose in popularity following the 2022 Russian invasion of Ukraine, and Sweden applied to join the organisation on 18 May 2022. On 5 July 2022, NATO signed the accession protocol for Sweden to join the alliance.

History 
In the 19th century, Sweden adopted a policy of neutrality, largely as a result of Sweden's involvement in the Napoleonic Wars during which over a third of the country's territory was lost in the Finnish War (1808–1809), including the traumatic loss of Finland to Russia. From this point onwards, Finland remained a part of Russia until it gained independence in 1917. Resentment towards the Swedish king Gustav IV Adolf, who had consistently pursued an anti-Napoleonic policy and thereby caused the war, precipitated a coup d'état known as the Coup of 1809. The new regime deposed the king and introduced the Instrument of Government (1809), later formulating a new foreign policy, which became known as The Policy of 1812. Since the time of the Napoleonic Wars, Sweden has not initiated any direct armed conflict.

Sweden chose not to join NATO when it was founded in 1949 and declared a security policy aiming for non-alignment in peace and neutrality in war. A modified version now qualifies non-alignment in peace for possible neutrality in war. Sweden maintained its policy of neutrality during the Cold War, despite substantial cooperation with the West. Former Prime Minister of Sweden Carl Bildt has noted that this policy was in response to fears that if Sweden were to join NATO the Soviet Union might respond by invading neighbouring Finland, with which Sweden retained close relations. While nominally independent, Finland adopted a policy of neutrality on foreign affairs during the Cold War in deference to the neighbouring Soviet Union, which was commonly referred to as Finlandization.

The accession of Sweden to the European Union in 1995 meant that neutrality as a principle was abolished. Since the 1990s, there has been an active debate in Sweden on the question of NATO membership in the post–Cold War era. These ideological divides were visible in November 2006, when Sweden could either buy two new transport planes or join NATO's plane pool, and in December 2006, when Sweden was invited to join the NATO Response Force. Sweden joined NATO's Partnership for Peace on 9 May 1994, and has been an active participant in NATO-led missions in Bosnia (IFOR and SFOR), Kosovo (KFOR), Afghanistan (ISAF), and Libya (Operation Unified Protector). Sweden signed in 2014 and ratified in 2016 a host country agreement with NATO, allowing NATO forces to conduct joint training exercises on Swedish soil and allowing NATO member states' forces to be deployed in Sweden in response to threats to Sweden's national security.

If the situation in and around the Baltic countries were to escalate, Swedish NATO membership, possibly together with Finland, would reduce barriers to NATO intervention in the region. NATO reported in 2015 that Russia simulated a nuclear attack on Sweden in 2013. Russian foreign minister Sergey Lavrov threatened in 2016 to "take necessary measures" to prevent Swedish NATO membership.  A government-sponsored report on the future of Sweden's NATO membership was released in September 2016.

Polls 
Support for NATO membership rose between 2012 and 2015, when the SOM Institute showed it growing from 17% to 31%. Events like the annexation of Crimea and reports of Russian submarine activity in 2014, as well as a 2013 report that Sweden could hold out for only a week if attacked, were credited with that rise in support.  In October 2014, an opinion poll found for the first time more Swedes in favor of NATO membership (37%) than opposed (36%).

Ipsos has conducted regular polling, and they have documented a decline in the opposition to membership from 56% in April 2015 to 35% in December 2020, when their poll showed a three-way split among Swedes, with 33% supporting NATO membership and 32% undecided on the issue. The decline largely corresponds to an increase in undecideds, as the percent of Swedes who support NATO membership has stayed mostly steady since 2014. According to a poll conducted by Sifo in June 2016, more Swedes were against a Swedish NATO membership than in favour, while a May 2017 poll by Pew also showed that 48% supported membership, and in November 2020, they showed that 65% of Swedes viewed NATO positively, the highest percent of any non-NATO member polled.

Since the Russian Invasion of Ukraine 
A Novus poll conducted 24–25 February 2022 found 41% in favour of NATO membership and 35% opposed. On 4 March 2022, a poll was released that showed 51% support NATO membership, the first time a poll has shown a majority supporting this position.

Political views on membership 
Former Prime Minister Fredrik Reinfeldt stated on 18 September 2007 that Swedish membership in NATO would require a "very wide" majority in Parliament, including the Social Democrats, and coordination with Finland.

The Swedish left wing, including the Social Democratic Party, the Green Party and the Left Party, along with the nationalist Sweden Democrats, have historically favored neutrality and non-alignment, while the parties on the right wing have supported NATO membership, especially since the 2014 Annexation of Crimea by the Russian Federation.  The centre-right Moderate Party is the largest party by current parliamentary representation in favour of NATO membership, even making it their top election pledge in 2022, and (like the centre-right Liberal Party) has generally supported NATO membership since the end of the Cold War.  The centrist Centre Party was opposed to NATO membership until September 2015, when party leadership under Annie Lööf announced that they would motion to change the party policy to push for Sweden to join NATO at their next party conference. The conservative Christian Democrats, also previously opposed, likewise voted to support NATO membership at their October 2015 party meeting. When the nationalist Sweden Democrats adjusted their stance in December 2020 to allow for NATO membership if coordinated with neighboring Finland and ratified in a referendum, a majority of the members of the Swedish Riksdag for the first time belonged to parties that were open to NATO membership, and a motion to allow for future NATO membership passed the parliament that month by 204 votes to 145.

However, many political positions on NATO membership were reviewed since the 2022 Russian invasion of Ukraine. The nationalist Sweden Democrats revised their stance in April 2022 and announced that they would support Swedish membership in NATO if Finland also joins.  Around the same time, the ruling Swedish Social Democratic Party announced that they would be conducting an internal dialogue on NATO membership, for a second time in 6 months. The first time, the party decided to oppose membership.  However, on 15 May 2022 they announced that they would now support an application to join the organization. Of their coalition partners, the Green Party remain opposed, while the Left Party would like to hold a referendum on the subject, something Prime Minister Magdalena Andersson and the leading opposition Moderate party have opposed.

Accession bid 
 

On 17 May 2022, Ann Linde, Sweden's foreign minister, signed Sweden's application to join NATO, following Finland's earlier intention to join NATO. On 18 May 2022, both countries formally applied to join NATO.

The European Union announced its support for Finland and Sweden's NATO membership.

Turkish president Recep Tayyip Erdoğan voiced his opposition to Finland and Sweden joining NATO, saying that it would be "impossible" for Turkey to support their application while the two countries allow groups which Turkey classifies as terrorist organizations, including the Kurdish militant groups Kurdistan Workers' Party (PKK), Kurdistan Communities Union (KCK), Democratic Union Party (Syria) (PYD), and People's Defense Units (YPG) and the supporters of Fethullah Gülen, a US-based Muslim cleric accused by Turkey of orchestrating a failed 2016 Turkish coup d'état attempt, to operate on their territory. (The PKK is on the European Union's list of terrorist organizations and Sweden was the first country after Turkey to label them as such in 1984.) Turkey has requested the extradition of several members of the PKK from the Nordic countries. People whom Turkey has requested to be extradited include independent Member of the Swedish Parliament Amineh Kakabaveh for her support of Kurdish organisations, writer and poet Mehmet Sıraç Bilgin (who died in 2015), and the Turkish publisher and human rights activist Ragip Zarakolu. In addition, the Turkish government has demanded that the arms embargo imposed by the Finnish and Swedish governments in response to its operations against the YPG in Syria be lifted, and the dismissal of defence minister Peter Hultqvist because he met in 2011 with members of the PKK. Turkey's demands for extradition of Kurdish and other political dissidents has been met with hostility by Kurdish activists and some human rights organizations, for Turkey's poor human rights record and suppression of the Kurdish minority in Turkey. On 14 May 2022, Turkish Foreign Minister Mevlüt Çavuşoğlu said, "These two countries (Finland and Sweden) very openly support the PKK and YPG". On 17 May 2022, German Chancellor Olaf Scholz called on Turkey to approve Finland and Sweden's NATO membership. On 18 May 2022, Turkey quickly prevented Finland and Sweden from starting NATO membership negotiations. On May 19, 2022, Finland and Sweden announced that they could address Turkey's security concerns. On the same day, Finnish President Sauli Niinistö and Former Swedish Prime Minister Magdalena Andersson announced that they were always ready for talks with Turkey and always condemned terrorism. On 21 May 2022, Former Swedish Prime Minister Magdalena Andersson, after a phone call with Turkish President Recep Tayyip Erdoğan, told Swedish state television SVT that they were ready for dialogue with Turkey on Sweden's NATO membership and they always condemned terrorism. On 24 May 2022, Finland and Sweden decided to send a delegation to meet with Turkey. Jukka Salovaara from Finland, Oscar Stenström from Sweden, İbrahim Kalın and Sedat Önal from Turkey are serving in the memorandum negotiations.

Opposition parties CHP and HDP in Turkey announced that they support the membership of Finland and Sweden. The ruling parties in Turkey, the AKP and MHP have announced that they will not support the membership of Finland and Sweden. The position of the governing Social Democratic Party is complicated by the fact that it relies on the support of Kakabaveh, who is of Iranian Kurdish descent, to retain the confidence of the Riksdag for their minority government.  Kakabaveh was a member of the Kurdish guerilla Komala in Iran since her youth, and took refuge in Sweden at the age of nineteen.  In the 2021 Swedish government crisis, Kakabaveh only agreed to support the formation of a government headed by Magdalena Andersson after some political demands concerning support for Syrian Kurds were met. She is opposed to the NATO accession of Sweden, because of her own experiences of war, and is a defender of the Swedish policy of non-alignment. In May, she declared that she would no longer support the governing Swedish Social Democratic Party in important votes in the parliament since she considered parts of the previous agreement had not been followed.

Ibrahim Kalin, spokesman for Erdoğan, said that approving Swedish membership was not being ruled out, but that the status of these groups was "a matter of national security for Turkey" and that negotiation would be required. However, after Ibrahim Kalin's statement, Erdoğan reiterated his threat to block Finland's and Sweden's membership applications. NATO leadership and the United States have said they were confident Turkey would not hold up the two countries accession process. Canadian Foreign Minister Mélanie Joly also held talks with Turkey to convince the Turkish government of the need for the two Nordic nations integration. On 20 May Ann Linde, Sweden's minister for foreign affairs, pushed back against Erdoğan's claim they support PKK calling it "disinformation", and pointing out Sweden listed PKK as a terrorist organization in 1984, while the EU followed suit in 2002. Spokesperson İbrahim Kalın, who led the talks on behalf of Turkey, stated after the first meeting in Ankara that the process would not progress until Turkey's expectations were met and they did not feel any time pressure on them. After a delegation consisting of Swedish and Finnish diplomats held talks on the matter with its Turkish counterparts, Erdogan repeated that he would not consent to their accession bid as the same day the talks were held in Ankara, Salih Muslim, who is considered a terrorist by Erdogan, appeared on Swedish television. Nationalist Movement Party leader Devlet Bahçeli suggested that a scenario in which Turkey would leave NATO should be considered an option, in which case a new military alliance could be founded. In late May 2022, opposition leader Kemal Kiliçdaroglu argued that in case the accession row persisted and AKP and MHP decided to close the Incirlik Airbase, the CHP would support this.

To address Turkey's concerns, in June Sweden pointed to reforms to its anti-terrorism laws which will come into force on 1 July, and announced that it would review its policies on weapons exports to reflect its NATO membership.  Meanwhile, Finnish president Sauli Niinistö stated that his country would not move forward with their application without Sweden, and that the two countries would join NATO "hand in hand".

At the 2022 Madrid summit, Andersson, Niinistö, and Erdoğan signed an agreement to address Turkey's security concerns, and Niinistö announced that Turkey had agreed to support membership of NATO for Finland and Sweden. While NATO members unanimously agreed to formally invite the counties to join the following day and the accession protocols for Sweden and Finland to join the alliance were signed on 5 July, Erdogan reiterated his threat to veto of their membership, stating that he expected the applicant countries to meet their obligations under the agreement before Turkey's parliament would consider approving their accession protocol. Finland, Sweden, and Turkey held their first trilateral memorandum meeting on 26 August 2022 in Vantaa, Finland. The second memorandum meeting between Finland, Sweden and Turkey was held on 25 November 2022 in Stockholm, Sweden.
The third meeting of the Finland, Sweden and Turkey tripartite memorandum meeting will be held on 9 March 2023 in Brussels, the capital of Belgium.
Turkey has announced that it will not approve NATO membership in the Turkish Grand National Assembly if Finland and Sweden do not fulfill their triple memorandum commitments.

By November, Sweden's NATO membership had been ratified by 28 out of 30 member states, with only Hungary and Turkey not having so far done so. During the process of application, Sweden held elections resulting in a center-right government that pledged to continue the NATO process, reaffirming a united front with Finland's application, and suggesting that they would be more able to meet Turkish requirements. On 24 November 2022 Hungary's Prime Minister Viktor Orban announced he was backing Sweden and Finland's accession to NATO, promising Hungary will ratify NATO membership in January. Later, on 13 December, Gergely Gulyás, Orban's chief of staff, stated that the Hungarian legislature would start debating the ratification process of Sweden and Finland's NATO accession on 20 February 2023. On 8 January 2023, Swedish Prime Minister Ulf Kristersson stated that "Turkey both confirms that we have done what we said we would do, but they also say that they want things that we cannot or do not want to give them", with additional negotiations planned for later that month and sometime later in the Spring of 2023.  

In January 2023 and in view of the continued Turkish refusal to agree to Swedish NATO membership Jimmie Åkesson of the Sweden Democrats reasoned that there were limits to how far Sweden would go to appease Turkey "because it is ultimately an anti-democratic system and a dictator we are dealing with".

On 23 January 2023, Turkish Defense Minister Hulusi Akar announced that Turkey fully fulfilled the Turkey–Finland–Sweden tripartite memorandum, while Finland and Sweden did not. In addition, Akar announced that they expect Finland and Sweden to fully comply with the triple memorandum.

Turkish President Recep Tayyip Erdoğan has announced that he will not look favorably on Sweden's NATO membership. In the meantime, Akar said the visit of the Swedish defence chief was cancelled due to the "provocative act, which is clearly a hate crime" for the permission of burning the Quran.

Finland, Sweden and Turkey tripartite memorandum meetings were canceled indefinitely upon Turkey's request. The third meeting of the Finland, Sweden, Turkey tripartite memorandum was to be held in Brussels, the capital of Belgium, in February. On 24 January 2023, Finnish Foreign Minister Pekka Haavisto announced that the trilateral memorandum talks with Finland, Sweden and Turkey would likely be suspended until after the parliamentary and presidential elections in Turkey.

On 28 January 2023, Swedish Foreign Minister Tobias Billström announced that he suspended the tripartite memorandum talks with Sweden, Finland and Turkey. On 1 February 2023, President Recep Tayyip Erdoğan announced that Turkey had a positive view of Finland's NATO membership and not Sweden's NATO membership, due to Sweden allowing a demonstration by far-right politician, Rasmus Paludan, wherein he burnt the Islamic holy book, the Quran.

In March 2023, Jens Stoltenberg pushed for Hungary and Turkey to finalize the accession of Finland and Sweden by the July summit. On March 15, President Recep Tayyip Erdoğan and Turkish officials indicated that Finland's application would be approved in mid-April while Sweden's would be approved independently.

Membership timeline 

The ratification process began with the invitation of Finland and Sweden to become members at the NATO summit in Madrid. Member negotiations were held on 4 July, and the Accession Protocols were signed in Brussels on the 5th.

Ratification process

Note

Sweden's foreign relations with NATO member states

  Albania
  Belgium
  Bulgaria
  Canada
  Croatia
  Czech Republic
  Denmark
  Estonia
  France
  Germany
  Greece
  Hungary
  Iceland
  Italy
  Latvia
  Lithuania
  Luxembourg
  Montenegro
  Netherlands
  North Macedonia
  Norway
  Poland
  Portugal
  Romania
  Slovakia
  Slovenia
  Spain
  Turkey
  United Kingdom
  United States

See also 
 Foreign relations of Sweden
 Foreign relations of NATO 
 Enlargement of NATO 
 Partnership for Peace
 European Union–NATO relations 
 Human rights in Sweden
 Finland–NATO relations

References 

Sweden–NATO relations
Foreign relations of Sweden
NATO relations